The DS 6 is a subcompact luxury crossover SUV designed by the French automaker DS Automobiles specifically for the market in Asia. It was the second model of DS, then a sub brand, to not feature the Citroën logo, following the launch of the DS 5LS earlier in 2014. First announced to the public in April 2014 as the DS 6WR, it was released for sale in the autumn of 2014.

It is powered by a four-cylinder 1.6 litre (1598 cc) petrol engine, producing  at 5800 rpm and  torque at 1700 to 4500 rpm. It is claimed to accelerate from 0–100 km in 8.4 seconds.

The DS 6 was exported to Iran and Angola.

References

External links

DS vehicles
Flagship vehicles
Compact sport utility vehicles
Crossover sport utility vehicles
Cars of China
Cars introduced in 2014
2010s cars